Hypodoxa conspurcata is a moth of the family Geometridae first described by Thomas Pennington Lucas in 1898. It is found in Australia, including Queensland.

References

Moths described in 1898
Pseudoterpnini